The Ireland national rugby sevens team competes in several international rugby sevens competitions. The team is governed by the Irish Rugby Football Union (IRFU).

Ireland competes as a "core team" on the World Rugby Sevens Series, a competition every year from December to June that includes ten tournaments staged around the globe. The 2019–20 season is Ireland's first season as a core team. At the 2019 Hong Kong Sevens Ireland won the World Series Qualifier tournament for the 2019–20 World Rugby Sevens Series, earning "core team" status for the first time. Prior to this Ireland had competed in individual tournaments within World Rugby Sevens Series, though not as a core team. Ireland's became the first non-core side to medal at a World Series tournament at the 2018 London Sevens, where they finished in third place. Since their inclusion as a core side, they have earned 2nd place finishes twice, at the 2022 France Sevens and the 2022 Dubai Sevens.

Ireland also competes in major quadrennial rugby sevens tournaments and their qualifying tournaments. Ireland has competed in most Rugby World Cup Sevens since the 1993 inaugural event, with their best results including finishing third in 1993 and ninth in 2018. The team also competes during qualifying for the Summer Olympics, but failed to qualify for the inaugural rugby sevens competition at the 2016 Summer Olympics. On 20 June 2021 Ireland qualified for the 2020 Summer Olympics.

Following the announcement in 2009 that rugby sevens would be an Olympic sport beginning in 2016, the Irish Rugby Football Union created a men's rugby sevens program in 2014. In 2015 the IRFU announced its goal to field a national sevens team that would qualify for the Summer Olympics and the World Rugby Sevens Series. Ireland has since begun offering professional contracts to its squad of sevens players. In 2022 Ireland equalled their best ever World Cup Sevens performance, winning the bronze medal.

Ireland also participates in the Rugby Europe Sevens Series.

History
Ireland competed at the 1973 International Seven-A-Side Tournament, the first rugby sevens tournament for national teams. They defeated New Zealand, Australia and Scotland in the groups phase, before losing to England in the finals.

Olympic era (2009–present)
Ireland has increased its emphasis in rugby sevens since the International Olympic Committee voted in 2009 to restore rugby to the events program in 2016. In March 2011, the IRFU announced its support for Shamrock Warriors RFC. The club's aim is to develop a pool of experienced Sevens players for the IRFU to be in position to select to develop into a future international Sevens squad to compete in tournaments by giving them experience playing in the top level competition should the IRFU become involved in professional international sevens or in the Olympic Sevens.

Although rugby was announced in 2009 as an Olympic sport, the IRFU was slow to recognize the opportunity. As of September 2013, the IRFU said it was unlikely to send a sevens team to the 2016 Summer Olympics. The IRFU did not introduce a men's rugby sevens national team program until October 2014. The IRFU announced in December 2014 the hiring of Anthony Eddy as the Director of Irish rugby sevens, both the men's and women's teams.
In December 2014 the IRFU issued a notice to all Irish athletes to see what if could become an Elite Sevens rugby player. The IRFU hoped to see the best rugby club talent available as well as attracting athletes with transferable skills from other team sports such as athletics, basketball, and Gaelic Games.  The IRFU held four talent identification days across Ireland in January 2015.

The IRFU announced in May 2015 its brand new 27-man squad for the 2015 season, selected out of a pool of more than 300 applicants, a squad that later became known as "The Originals". The new team started at the bottom, beginning the 2015 season in Europe's Division C, with an eye towards gaining promotion to higher levels of competition. The highlight of Ireland's 2015 and 2016 seasons was the attempt to qualify for the 2016 Summer Olympics. At the 2015 Europe Olympic Repechage Tournament, Ireland finished with 4–1–1 record, and despite a 10–24 semifinal loss to Russia, their third-place finish gained the last European slot for the 2016 Final Olympic Qualification Tournament. At the 2016 Final Olympic Qualifying Tournament, Ireland finished pool play with a 3–0 record including a 27–21 win over Samoa. However, a quarterfinal loss to Spain (7–12) eliminated them from the 2016 Summer Olympics.

Entering the 2017 season, with the Irish men's rugby sevens program in place for just over two years, the IRFU still had not handed out any full-time professional contracts to any sevens players.
For the 2017 summer season, Ireland played in the European Grand Prix Sevens, which included four tournaments during summer 2017. Ireland began the Grand Prix by winning the first tournament, the 2017 Moscow Sevens, defeating Spain 12–0 in the final.

For the 2017–18 season, Ireland selected a core squad of 14 players that would prioritize Sevens play for the autumn 2017 tournaments, although they are not full-time Sevens players, and they retain their club status. Ireland finished ninth at the 2017 Silicon Valley Sevens with a 3–2 record; their record against World Series core teams was a respectable 2–2, with two wins over Canada.

As of December 2018 the IRFU was due to announce shortly their first-ever professional contracts for sevens players. In May 2019, despite the squad qualifying for the World Rugby Sevens Series, the IRFU announced that players would remain on an €18,000 basic annual salary with bonuses of €500 for participating in each of the 10 World Series tournaments — the equivalent of a development contract.

In March 2022, Anthony Eddy stepped down both as IRFU director of women's rugby and 7's rugby. Ireland secured their best ever overall finish in the World Rugby Sevens Series with a 5th place finish in the 2021–22 series. Later that year, Ireland equalled its best World Cup Sevens performance, winning the bronze medal for the second time (the first in 1993). Terry Kennedy capped off the program's successful season, by winning the World Rugby Sevens Player of the Year, mirroring the achievement of his XV's countrymen and counterpart, Josh van der Flier.

Current squad 

The following players comprise Ireland's squad for the 2022–23 World Rugby Sevens Series.

Season statistics

The following table shows the leading Irish players during the 2021–22 Sevens Series season, ranked by tackles.

World Rugby Sevens Series

Ireland had a sparse participation in the World Rugby Sevens Series until 2019. Between 1999 and 2019 Ireland appeared only sporadically, and not as one of the core teams that participated in every tournament. Ireland played in very few tournaments on the World Series, such as the occasional trip to the Hong Kong Sevens. Ireland has had some limited success in the World Series tournaments in which it has played.

Ireland competed in two of the ten tournaments of the inaugural 1999–2000 World Sevens Series: at the 2000 Hong Kong Sevens, Ireland finished 17th to win the Bowl with a 4–2 record; at the 2000 Paris Sevens, Ireland finished tied for 11th with a 3–2 record. The following season, in the 2000–01 World Sevens Series, Ireland played in the 2000 Dubai Sevens where they finished 9th, winning the Bowl with a 4–2 record, including a 19–17 semifinal win over Wales.

Ireland has, however, since assembling a permanent sevens program in 2014, publicly stated in 2014 and again in 2015 that its goal is to qualify as one of the 15 core teams in the World Series. At the 2018 Hong Kong Sevens qualifying tournament for the 2018–19 World Series, Ireland posted a 3–0 record in pool play, winning all three matches by comfortable 20+ point margins, to advance to the knockout rounds. Ireland defeated Zimbabwe 38–5 in the quarterfinals, but lost to Japan 7–12 in the semifinal and failed to qualify for the 2018-19 World Series.

Ireland competed as an invitational team at the 2018 London Sevens and the 2018 Paris Sevens. At the 2018 London Sevens Ireland defeated the favoured United States and England teams en route to finishing third overall.
At the penultimate World Rugby Sevens Series event in London in 2018, the Irish team "stole the show", finishing in third place in their first World Series tournament since 2004, Ireland thus becoming the first invitational side to reach the semi-finals and then the podium of a World Rugby Sevens Series event. Invited to the following event in Paris, Ireland finished seventh, their second top half finish as an invitational side, and the first invitational side to do so.

The following year, Ireland again played in the 2019 Hong Kong Sevens qualifier. Ireland won the tournament, defeating Hong Kong 28–7 in the final, with Jordan Conroy’s 10 tries across six matches earning him Player of the Tournament. Ireland again appeared at the 2019 London Sevens and 2019 Paris Sevens, reaching the quarterfinals of the London Sevens.

Ireland joined the World Rugby Sevens Series as a "core status" team for the first time for the 2019–20 season. In their first tournament, the 2019 Dubai Sevens, Jordan Conroy led all scores with seven tries and was named to the tournament Dream Team. 
The ten-tournament season was cut to six tournaments due to the global Covid-19 pandemic. Ireland reached the quarter-final round in three of the six tournaments during the season, finishing in 10th place. Wing Jordan Conroy led all try scorers in the competition with 30 tries, with centre Terry Kennedy finishing fifth with 17 tries. In May 2022, Ireland achieved their highest ever position at a World Series event, reaching the final of the Toulouse Sevens before falling 17–29 to Fiji. Ireland reached their second World Series final at the 2022 Dubai Sevens losing to South Africa in the final, 5–21.

Season by season

Updated as of 5 March 2023 
Results listed above do not include matches played as part of the Hong Kong World Series qualifier competition.

Summer Olympics

2016 Olympics qualifying

Ireland began Olympic qualifying by playing in Division C within Europe. 
In the 6–7 June 2015 Division C tournament, Ireland went 6–0 in the competition to win Division C, winning all six matches by a comfortable margin. This win qualified them to participate in Division B.
In the 20–21 June, 2015 Division B tournament, Ireland again went 6–0 to win Division B, again winning all six matches by a comfortable margin. This win qualified them for the European repechage tournament.

In the 18–19 July 2015 Rugby Europe sevens repechage in Lisbon, Ireland topped their group with wins over Italy and Georgia and a draw against Russia. In the knockout competition, Ireland defeated Lithuania 17–0 in the quarterfinals. Ireland then lost in the semifinals to Russia 10–24, but in the third-place match defeated Georgia 15–7 to finish third overall, and secure the third and final European qualifying place for the Final 2016 Men's Olympic Qualification Tournament.

The Irish team drew Samoa, Tonga and Zimbabwe in the final Olympic repechage tournament in Monaco. Ireland finished first in their group with three wins, including a close 27–21 over World Series team Samoa. Ireland lost in the quarterfinals to Spain, 7–12, and did not qualify for the Olympics.

2020 Olympics
Ireland finished third at the 2019 Rugby Europe qualifying tournament. With this result, they did not automatically qualify for the 2020 Olympics, but gained a spot in the final inter-continental playoff tournament. They then won the playoff tournament to secure the last qualifying spot in the 2020 Summer Olympics.

Ireland opened their 2020 Olympic campaign with losses to both South Africa and the United States. Despite a five point victory over Kenya and a third place finish in their pool, Ireland failed to achieve a quarterfinal spot due to an unfavourable points difference. They subsequently defeated South Korea 31–0, before losing to Kenya, to finish in 10th place.

Previous Olympic Squads
2020 Ireland Olympic squad

Rugby World Cup Sevens

Ireland has played in six out of the seven Rugby World Cup Sevens tournaments. Ireland's best finish was the inaugural 1993 tournament. In that tournament, they went 4–1 in pool play, including an upset win over France, to qualify to the quarterfinal round. In the quarterfinal round of pool play they went 2–1 with wins over Samoa and Tonga to reach the semifinals. Ireland faced Australia in the semifinal and was leading but an Australia try and conversion at the end resulted in a 19–21 loss.

Since the inaugural tournament, however, Ireland's performances have been comparatively unremarkable, as they have yet to secure another quarterfinal place. At the 1997 tournament, Ireland finished 19th, posting a 1–5 record which included losses to minnows Hong Kong and Japan, with its only win a 33–5 victory over Portugal in the Bowl quarterfinal. In 2001, Ireland finished fifth in its group of six, unable to notch wins against Russia or Korea, relegating it to the Bowl competition; they defeated Chinese Taipei in the Bowl quarterfinal but lost 12–33 to Portugal in the Bowl semifinal.

In 2005, Ireland fared slightly better, with its 2–3 record in group play qualifying it for the Plate competition, where they lost to Samoa 14–19 in the Plate quarterfinal. In 2009, Ireland was up-and-down in pool play, notching a surprise win against Australia, but a disappointing loss against Portugal. Ireland was one of three teams in a four-team group to finish with a 1–2 record in pool play, but Ireland was ranked last in the group on points difference and was relegated to the Bowl competition. There they posted a 2–1 record in knockout play, eventually losing to Zimbabwe in the Bowl final 17–14. Ireland did not qualify for the 2013 World Cup, failing to send a team to the 2012 Sevens Grand Prix qualifying tournaments.

Ireland had a better tournament in 2018, defeating core teams Kenya, Wales, and Australia en route to a ninth-place finish, their best finish since the inaugural 1993 tournament. 

Ireland qualified for 2022 tournament, by going undefeated in their four matches at the 2022 Rugby World Cup Sevens European Qualifier in July 2022. At the tournament Ireland won four of their five matches including a 24–14 quarterfinal victory over hosts South Africa, on their way to a bronze medal finish.

Previous World Cup squads
 1993 Ireland Rugby World Cup Sevens
 1997 Ireland Rugby World Cup Sevens
 2001 Ireland Rugby World Cup Sevens
 2005 Ireland Rugby World Cup Sevens
 2009 Ireland Rugby World Cup Sevens
 2018 Ireland Rugby World Cup Sevens

Rugby Europe Sevens 

Updated 19 June 2022

2002−2014

Although Rugby Europe has held a rugby sevens championship every year since 2002, Ireland rarely participated from 2002 to 2014. Ireland participated only twice during those 13 years − in 2004 and 2008, both of which served as European regional qualifying tournaments for the following year's Rugby World Cup Sevens. Ireland finished third in the 2004 competition to qualify for the 2005 World Cup. Ireland finished fourth in the 2008 competition to qualify for the 2009 World Cup.

2015−present
The 2015 European competitions also doubled as qualifying for the 2016 Summer Olympics. Ireland played in the Division C tournament on 6–7 June and won the tournament with a 6–0 record, its closest match being the 38–10 quarterfinal win over Austria, qualifying for Division B. Ireland then played the Division B tournament on 20–21 June, and won Division B with a 6–0 record, its closest match being a 54–0 pool-play win over Slovenia, qualifying for the final repechage tournament.

Ireland played in the 2015 repechage on 18–19 July where they faced a tougher level of competition. Ireland went 2-1-0 in the repechage pool play to win its group and reach the knockout rounds. Ireland lost to Russia in the semifinals, 10–24, but defeated Georgia 15–7 to take third place and secure the last qualifying spot for the final cross-continental Olympic qualifying tournament. They lost in these quarterfinals to Spain and did not make the 2016 Summer Olympics medal round.

The 2016 Trophy competition consisted of two tournaments – Malmo and Prague. Ireland went 6–0 to win the 2016 Malmo tournament, with the closest match being the 26–12 semifinal win over Ukraine. Ireland next won the 2016 Prague tournament, again with a perfect 6–0 record, with the closest match being the 24–0 semifinal win over Romania. Ireland finished first in the 2016 Trophy competition and won promotion to the 2017 Grand Prix series.

The 2017 Grand Prix series consisted of four tournaments. Ireland began the Grand Prix by winning the 2017 Moscow Sevens with a 5–1 record, defeating Russia 28–21 in the semifinals and Spain 12–0 in the finals. Next, Ireland finished third in the 2017 Lodz Sevens with a 5–1 record, losing to Russia 19–26 in the semifinals. Ireland next won the 2017 Clermont-Ferrand Sevens with a 6–0 record, defeating Russia 17–14 in the final. In the fourth and final tournament, the 2017 Exeter Sevens, Ireland finished with a 5–1 record, losing to Wales 12–15 in the semifinals. Ireland finished the 2017 Sevens Grand Prix Series in second place two points behind Russia, thereby qualifying for the 2018 Rugby World Cup Sevens, and advancing to the 2018 Hong Kong Sevens qualifying tournament for the 2018-19 World Series.

In the 2018 Europe Grand Prix Series, Ireland started strong, winning the 2018 Moscow Sevens with a 6–0 record, winning all six matches by a margin of more than 20 points.

Having not participated in Rugby Europe Sevens since 2019, Ireland returned to the Trophy Series by winning the opening leg of the Series in Zagreb, defeating England in the final. The following week they claimed the 2022 Rugby Europe Sevens Trophy and sealed their promotion back to the Rugby Europe Championship by winning all six matches of the Budapest leg, defeating England in the final 35–14.

Other international tournaments 

The results listed above are inclusive of tournaments played outside of the World Rugby Sevens Series, Olympics, Rugby World Cup Sevens and the Rugby Europe Sevens tournaments.

Ireland Wolfhounds
An Irish Wolfhounds side, often composed of both Irish and English rugby internationals, competed at many of the Hong Kong Sevens events between 1984 and 1992. This team was not an official representative side. Nonetheless, they achieved moderate success reaching several Cup quarterfinals. The Wolfhounds also won the 1991 Melrose Sevens, an annual sevens competition contested by club sides. In 2015 the Wolfhounds returned as an 'A' side to help strengthen the national sevens player pool. The side competed in the GB7s tour against club competition.

Updated as of 4 March 2021.

Overall Record

The above records are up to date as of 5 March 2023.  
These records do not include matches played as the Ireland Wolfhounds.

Head to Head

Results are inclusive of all international competitions. 
Updated as of 5 March 2023

Honours
1973 International Seven-a-side Tournament
 Runner-up: 1973

Rugby World Cup Sevens
 Third-place: 1993, 2022

Dubai Sevens
 Runner-up: 2022

France Sevens
 Runner-up: 2022

London Sevens
 Third-place: 2018

World Series qualifier
Winners: 2019

Rugby Europe Sevens
Winners: 2018
 Runner-up: 2017
 Third-place: 2004, 2019

Rugby Europe Sevens Trophy
Winners: 2016, 2022

Rugby Europe Sevens Division B
Winners: 2015

Rugby Europe Sevens Division C
Winners: 2015

Elche Invitational
 Runner-up: 2017, 2019
 Third-place: 2015

International Rugby 7s
Winners: 2021

Player records

World Series (career)

The tables above show players career statistics from the World Rugby Sevens Series main tournament up to 5 March 2023.

The Irish record holders in the World Series for the era preceding the Olympics and professional era of rugby sevens are:
 Most matches: Aidan Kearney (13)
 Most tries: James Topping (13)
 Most points: James Topping (67)

World Series (season)

World Cup

The tables above show players career statistics from the Rugby World Rugby Cup Sevens up to 11 September 2022.

Other notable players
 British and Irish Lions

 Tadhg Beirne
 Vince Cunningham
 Mick Galwey
 Mike Gibson
 Denis Hickie
 Eric Miller
 Tomás O'Leary
 Fergus Slattery
 Richard Wallace

 internationals

 Robert Baloucoune
 Tadhg Beirne
 Jonny Bell
 Vinny Becker
 Adam Byrne
 Kieran Campbell
 Donal Canniffe
 Brian Carney
 Darren Cave
 Ben Cronin
 Vince Cunningham
 Shane Daly
 Kieron Dawson
 Seamus Dennison
 Eric Elwood
 Mick Galwey
 Mike Gibson
 Chris Henry
 David Humphreys
 Paddy Johns
 Felix Jones
 Ian Keatley
 Hugo Keenan
 Niall Malone
 Paul Marshall
 Kevin Mays
 Denis McBride
 Aidan McCullen
 Arthur McMaster
 Eric Miller
 Terry Moore
 Matt Mostyn
 Jimmy O'Brien
 Tomás O'Leary
 David Quinlan
 Alain Rolland
 Fergus Slattery
 Nick Timoney
 James Topping
 Richard Wallace
 Pa Whelan
 Niall Woods

 IRFU referees

 John Lacey
 Alain Rolland

Head coaches

Notes

References

 
National rugby sevens teams
Rugby sevens in Ireland